Badrabad (also Romanized as Badrābād) is a village in Sara Rural District in the Central District of Saqqez County, Kurdistan Province, Iran. As of the 2006 census, its population was 167, with 29 families. The village is populated by Kurds.

References 

Towns and villages in Saqqez County
Kurdish settlements in Kurdistan Province